National Highway 67 (NH 67, previously National Highway 63) is a major National Highway in India. It starts at Ramnagar on NH 748, Belagavi - Panjim Road of Karnataka and ends at Krishnapatnam Port road in Andhra Pradesh.

Currently four laning works going on between Badvel and Nellore. Four laning works between Jammalamadugu and Mydukur completed. NHAI called tenders for two laning between Gooty and Tadipatri.

4 Lane work is in Progress between Hubballi and Hosapete, 6 Lane work between Hosapete and Ballari and 4 lane work between Ballari and Karnataka - Andhra Pradesh Border.

Route 
NH-67 passes through the cities of Dharwad, Hubballi, Gadag, Koppal, Hosapete, Ballari in Karnataka and Guntakal, Gooty, Jammalamadugu, Proddatur, Mydukur, Badvel, Marripadu, Nellore, Krishnapatnam Port road of Andhra Pradesh.

Route length in states
Karnataka -  
Andhra Pradesh –

Junctions  
 
  near Mydukur
  near Nellore

See also 
 List of National Highways in India by highway number
 National Highway 66 (India)

References 

National highways in India
67
67